The Northamptonshire Cricket Board is the governing body for all recreational cricket in the historic county of Northamptonshire.

From 1999 to 2002 the Board fielded a team in the English domestic one-day tournament, matches which had List-A status. The Board's final List A match was in the first round of the 2003 Cheltenham and Gloucester Trophy which was held in August 2002.

See also
List of Northamptonshire Cricket Board List A players

References

External links
 Northamptonshire Cricket Board

County Cricket Boards
Cricket in Northamptonshire